Lamprempis is a genus of flies in the family Empididae.

Species
L. benigna (Osten Sacken, 1887)
L. bezzii Smith, 1962
L. boracea Smith, 1962
L. calopoda Bezzi, 1905
L. chichimeca Wheeler & Melander, 1901
L. columbi (Schiner, 1868)
L. cucama Smith, 1962
L. cyanea (Bellardi, 1861)
L. cyaneus (Bellardi, 1861)
L. diaphorina (Osten Sacken, 1887)
L. dolichopodina (Schiner, 1868)
L. furcaticauda Smith, 1962
L. gemmea Bezzi, 1905
L. lindneri Engel, 1928
L. meridionalis Engel, 1928
L. sazimae Smith, 1975
L. setigera Coquillett, 1903
L. suavis (Loew, 1869)
L. superba (Loew, 1861)
L. truncatus Smith, 1962
L. tuberifera Smith, 1962
L. violacea (Loew, 1869)
L. viridis (Coquillett, 1895)

References

Empidoidea genera
Empididae